Aqa Bozorg (also Romanized as Āqā Bozorg and Āqā-ye Bozorg; also known as Boneh-ye Āqā-ye Bozorg) is a village in Qilab Rural District, Alvar-e Garmsiri District, Andimeshk County, Khuzestan Province, Iran. At the 2006 census, its population was 56, in 9 families.

References 

Populated places in Andimeshk County